Martial Bourdin (1868 – 15 February 1894) was a French anarchist, who died on 15 February 1894 when chemical explosives that he was carrying prematurely detonated outside the Royal Observatory in Greenwich Park, London.

Although Bourdin sustained massive injuries, he remained alive and able to speak.  He did not, however, reveal his name, specific target, or motives. He was carried to the Seamen's Hospital nearby, where he died 30 minutes later.

Later, police investigators discovered that Bourdin had left his room on Fitzroy Street in London and travelled by tram from Westminster to Greenwich Park.  The police concluded that "some mischance or miscalculation or some clumsy bungling" had caused the bomb to explode in Bourdin's hand.  Because he was found with a large sum of money, the police speculated that he had planned to leave for France immediately.

The police later raided the Club Autonomie in London, a popular club for foreign anarchists, including Bourdin.

Legacy
Bourdin's gruesome death and the mystery surrounding his attempted act inspired Joseph Conrad's novel, The Secret Agent. Some scholars believe T. S. Eliot references Bourdin in his Ariel poem "Animula" when he writes "Pray...// For Boudin, blown to pieces," although Eliot uses the spelling "Boudin" and may not have had the anarchist in mind.

Notes

References
Cronin, Isaac. Confronting Fear: A History of Terrorism (New York: Thunder's Mouth, 2002)
 

1868 births
1894 deaths
19th-century French criminals
Accidental deaths in London
Date of birth missing
Deaths by explosive device
French anarchists
Place of birth missing